Anzhelika Savrayuk (born 23 August 1989 in Lutsk, Ukrainian SSR, Soviet Union) is a Ukrainian-born Italian rhythmic gymnast.

Career 
Savrayuk has competed in two Olympic Games. She and the Italian group competed at the 2008 Summer Olympics in Beijing and finished 4th in the group all-around. She was part of the 2010 and 2011 Italian group that competed at the World Championships that won the Group all-around gold medal. Her teammates also won a pair of bronze medals at the 2012 World Cup Final in 5 Balls and 3 Ribbons + 2 Hoops. Savrayuk won a bronze medal at the 2012 Summer Olympics in the group all-around event together with other group members Romina Laurito, Marta Pagnini, Elisa Blanchi, Andreea Stefanescu, Elisa Santoni.

Detailed Olympic results

References

External links 
 
 
 

1989 births
Living people
Italian rhythmic gymnasts
Olympic gymnasts of Italy
Olympic bronze medalists for Italy
Olympic medalists in gymnastics
Gymnasts at the 2008 Summer Olympics
Gymnasts at the 2012 Summer Olympics
Medalists at the 2012 Summer Olympics
Ukrainian emigrants to Italy
Medalists at the Rhythmic Gymnastics World Championships
Medalists at the Rhythmic Gymnastics European Championships
Gymnasts of Centro Sportivo Aeronautica Militare
Naturalised citizens of Italy
Sportspeople from Lutsk